The women's discus throw at the 1998 European Athletics Championships was held at the Népstadion on 19 and 21 August.

Medalists

Results

Qualification
Qualification: Qualification Performance 63.85 (Q) or at least 12 best performers advance to the final.

Final

References

Results
Results
Results

Discus throw
Discus throw at the European Athletics Championships
1998 in women's athletics